Elections were held in the Cagayan Valley for seats in the House of Representatives of the Philippines on May 13, 2013.

The candidate with the most votes won that district's seat for the 16th Congress of the Philippines.

Summary

Batanes
Henedina Abad is the incumbent.

Cagayan

1st District
Incumbent Jack Enrile is running for the Senate; his wife Salvacion is his party's nominee.

2nd District
Baby Aline Vargas-Alfonso is the incumbent after winning a special election when Florencio Vargas, her father, died. As a result of independent candidate Sherwin Calimag's disqualification, Vargas-Alfonso is running unopposed.

3rd District
Randolph Ting is the incumbent.

Isabela

1st District
Rodolfo Albano Jr. is running for mayor of Cabagan, Isabela. His son, incumbent Vice Governor Rodolfo Albano III is his party's nominee

2nd District
Ana Cristina Go is the incumbent.

3rd District
Napoleon Dy is the incumbent.

4th District
Giorgidi Aggabao is the incumbent.

Nueva Vizcaya
Carlos M. Padilla is the incumbent.

Quirino
Incumbent Dakila Carlo Cua is running unopposed.

References

2013 Philippine general election
Lower house elections in the Cagayan Valley